Muammer Sarıkaya (born 9 February 1998) is a Turkish professional footballer who plays as a midfielder for Süper Lig club İstanbulspor.

Career
Sarıkaya is a youth product of the academies of Bakırköyspor and İstanbulspor. He began his senior career with İstanbulspor, signing a professional contract on 25 August 2015. He had successive loans to Ofspor, Başkent Gözgözler, Zonguldak Kömürspor and Esenler Erokspor to start his career, before returning to İstanbulspor. He helped İstanbulspor achieve promotion in the 2021–22 season for the first time in 17 years. He made his professional debut in İstanbulspor's return to the Süper Lig in a in a 2–0 season opening loss to Trabzonspor on 5 August 2022.

References

External links
 

1998 births
Living people
Footballers from Istanbul
Turkish footballers
İstanbulspor footballers
Ofspor footballers
Zonguldakspor footballers
Süper Lig players
TFF First League players
TFF Second League players
TFF Third League players
Association football midfielders